Opoku Afriyie (February 2, 1955 - March 29, 2020) was a Ghanaian footballer. He was popularly called Bayie. He played as a striker and won many caps with Asante Kotoko and the Ghana national football team. He worked for Asante Kotoko as Team-Manager.

Club career
Opoku Afriyie played for Asante Kotoko for several years before signing for Hearts of Oak prior to ending his footballing career. He was the top scorer in the Ghana domestic football league in 1979 and again in 1981. In 1982, he was nominated for the French magazine France Football African Footballer of the Year. He came eighth. Opoku Afriyie is among 20 other Ghanaians nominated by CAF out of a total of 200 African footballers for the title of the best African player of the last 50 years.

International career
He was a member of the squad that won the 1978 African Cup of Nations making Ghana the first team to win it thrice. He scored the two goals in the final of that tournament. He also played in the 1980 African Cup of Nations where Ghana failed to defend its title.

Coaching career
Opoku Afriyie was appointed team manager of Asante Kotoko in 2003. He has also served as the team manager and welfare officer of the Black Stars.

Honours

Club 
Asante Kotoko
 Ghana Premier League: 1980, 1981
 Ghanaian FA Cup: 1978

International 
Ghana
 African Cup of Nations: 1978 ,1982

Individual 
 Africa Cup of Nations top scorer: 1978
 Ghana Premier League Top scorer: 1979, 1981

References

1945 births
2020 deaths
Ghanaian footballers
Ghana international footballers
Africa Cup of Nations-winning players
1978 African Cup of Nations players
1980 African Cup of Nations players
1982 African Cup of Nations players
Asante Kotoko S.C. players
Accra Hearts of Oak S.C. players
Ghanaian football managers
Association football forwards
Ghana Premier League players
Asante Kotoko S.C. non-playing staff
Ghana Premier League top scorers